Arnas Beručka (born 17 March 1997) is a Lithuanian basketball player for BC Wolves of the Lithuanian Basketball League.

Professional career
Beručka started his professional career signing with BC Perlas in 2015. He played 2 seasons in Perlas. In the second season, he was one of team leaders, averaging 11 points per game. 

On 20 April 2017, Vytautas Prienai-Birštonas registered him because half of the team was injured and the pool of replacement candidates was small (LKL rules mandate a maximum age of signed players of 21 years).

On July 26, 2022, he has signed with BC Wolves of the Lithuanian Basketball League.

International career
Beručka represented Lithuanian youth national teams multiple times during the 2013 FIBA Europe Under-16 Championship, the 2015 FIBA Europe Under-18 Championship and the 2017 FIBA Europe Under-20 Championship.

References

External links
 Arnas Berucka at fiba.com

1997 births
Living people
BC Juventus
BC Prienai players
BC Wolves players
Lithuanian men's basketball players
Shooting guards
Small forwards